Western Kentucky University is a public university in Bowling Green, Kentucky. It was founded by the Commonwealth of Kentucky in 1906, though its roots reach back a quarter-century earlier. It operates regional campuses in Glasgow, Elizabethtown-Fort Knox, and Owensboro. The main campus, which has been undergoing expansion and renovation since the 1990s, sits atop a hill overlooking the Barren River valley.

History

The roots of Western Kentucky University go back to 1876 with the founding by A. W. Mell of the privately owned Glasgow Normal School and Business College in Glasgow, Kentucky. This moved to Bowling Green in 1884 and became the Southern Normal School and Business College. In 1890, Potter College was opened as a private women's college by Pleasant J. Potter. In 1906, Henry Hardin Cherry sold the Southern Normal School and became president of the Western Kentucky State Normal School, which had just been created by an act of the Kentucky General Assembly. Southern's student body and its building became the new school, with classes beginning on January 22, 1907. In 1909 Potter College closed and Western bought the buildings and property of the school. In 1911, Western relocated to its present site on the property that had been Potter College.

In 1922, the school was authorized by the state to grant four-year degrees and was renamed "Western Kentucky State Normal School and Teachers College". The first four-year degrees were awarded in 1924. In 1927, the school merged with Ogden College, which occupied an adjacent campus.  The name changed again in 1930 to "Western Kentucky State Teachers College". The school was authorized to offer the Master of Arts degree in 1931. Another name change took place in 1948, when the school became simply "Western Kentucky State College".

WKSC merged with the Bowling Green College of Commerce, which had formerly been the Bowling Green Business University, in 1963. Bowling Green Business University had originally been a part of the Southern Normal School and had been sold off by Henry Hardin Cherry when Southern Normal School was transferred to the state. The structure of the institution changed at this time, dividing into separate colleges. Bowling Green College of Commerce maintained its identity in this way. The Graduate School also became a constituent college. In 1965, three additional colleges were created. In 1966, Western Kentucky State College became Western Kentucky University.

For many years, the college was popularly known as "Western," as indicated in its fight song, "Stand Up and Cheer." However, administrators in recent years have preferred to call it "WKU."

On July 1, 2017, Timothy C. Caboni became the university's 10th president.

Academics

WKU is divided into the following academic colleges:

 The College of Education and Behavioral Sciences
 The Gordon Ford College of Business
 Ogden College of Science And Engineering
 Potter College of Arts and Letters
 The College of Health and Human Services

An academic range of eighty majors and seventy minors are offered, toward the following degrees:

 Bachelor of Engineering
 Bachelor of Arts
 Bachelor of Fine Arts
 Bachelor of Interdisciplinary Studies
 Bachelor of Science
 Bachelor of Science in Nursing
 Bachelor of Music
 Bachelor of Social Work

WKU also offers fifteen associate degree programs and five certificate programs.

The Graduate School is now the Office of Graduate Studies and Research, which offers:

Master of Accountancy
Master of Arts
Master of Arts in Education
Master of Business Administration
Master of Science
Master of Science in Nursing
Master of Social Work
Master of Public Administration
Master of Health Administration
Master of Public Health
Doctor of Education
Doctor of Nursing
Doctor of Physical Therapy

, twenty-seven alumni of WKU's photo and print journalism programs have been awarded thirteen Pulitzer Prizes, including eleven alumni recognized for their coverage of the Carrollton bus crash.  The school publishes a twice-weekly newspaper, the College Heights Herald.

WKU is home to a master's degree program in folklore. It is unique among American folklore programs for its public folklore program and is one of the few schools in Kentucky to offer a focus in historic preservation.

A doctoral program (EdD) in educational leadership has been offered at WKU since 2009. 

WKU's Regional Campuses are in Glasgow, Elizabethtown-Fort Knox and Owensboro.

Mahurin Honors College
The WKU Honors College became the first Honors College in the Commonwealth of Kentucky on July 1, 2007. The Honors College serves over 1,300 active Honors students with the 2016 incoming freshman class ACT/SAT average ranking among the top 6% in the nation.

Center for Gifted Studies
WKU's Center for Gifted Studies conducts research and provides opportunities for gifted and talented students, educators, and parents. Founded in 1981, its first events were workshops for gifted education professionals. It partnered with Duke's Talent Identification Program, and began offering academic summer camps: beginning in 1983, the Summer Camp for Academically Talented Middle School Students (SCATS) for students finishing grades 6–8, and beginning in 1984 the Summer Program for Verbally and Mathematically Precocious Youth (VAMPY) for students finishing grades 7–10. In 2011 the Center became the headquarters of the World Council for Gifted and Talented Children.

The Carol Martin Gatton Academy of Mathematics and Science in Kentucky
The Carol Martin Gatton Academy of Mathematics and Science in Kentucky opened in the Fall of 2007. The project is based on the University of North Texas's Texas Academy of Mathematics and Science. The school accepts roughly 100 high school juniors each year. As an incoming junior, students can earn at least 60 college credit hours during their time at the school. The Gatton Academy was named "America's Best High School" by Newsweek in 2012 and 2013. The building, originally designed in 1929, was renovated and expanded by RossTarrant Architects  to transform it into the Gatton Academy.

Athletics

The Western Kentucky (WKU) athletic teams are called the Hilltoppers (men's) and Lady Toppers (women's). Their mascot is known as Big Red. The mascot has become one of the most popular characters in collegiate sports, even appearing in a series of ESPN promotions. The university is a member of the NCAA Division I ranks, primarily competing in the Conference USA (C-USA) since the 2014–15 academic year. The Hilltoppers and Lady Toppers previously competed in the Sun Belt Conference from 1982–83 to 2013–14; and in the Ohio Valley Conference (OVC) from 1948–49 to 1981–82.

WKU competes in 16 intercollegiate varsity sports: Men's sports include baseball, basketball, cross country, football, golf and track & field; while women's sports include basketball, cross country, golf, soccer, softball, tennis, track & field and volleyball.

Swimming
The WKU swim team, before its suspension after the 2014–15 season, consistently placed in the top 5 in the Mid-Major National Rankings. In 2006 their men were undefeated in dual meets and were Sun Belt Conference Champions. The women won five consecutive championships from 2001 to 2005. In 2005, after 37 years as head coach, coach Bill Powell became an assistant coach, and holds record for being the second winningest coach in men's swimming in NCAA dual meet history.

In January 2015, former swimmer Colin Craig told police he had been assaulted and forced to drink alcohol, even though at the time he was too young to buy or drink alcohol. He also reported incidents of hazing at a house near campus. An investigation by police and school officials revealed numerous incidents of drug use and sexually charged hazing dating back to at least 2012. Powell's successor, Bruce Marchionda, was aware of this behavior and did nothing to prevent it, even though it violated university policies on hazing, sexual harassment and sexual misconduct. One swimmer was charged with possession of marijuana.  On April 14, WKU officials announced the swimming and diving program would be suspended for five years due to what former school president Gary Ransdell called a "pervasive" and "intolerable" environment. The program's return after the suspension was placed in serious doubt after WKU officials canceled all funding for the swimming and diving program in 2018 as part of larger budget cuts to the athletic department. According to the Bowling Green Daily News, the program would likely not return in 2020 without "significant" outside donations.

Baseball
The baseball team has enjoyed some success, winning the Sun Belt Conference tournament championship in 2009.  In April 2010, the WKU baseball team defeated the University of Kentucky 24–8 in a game at Bowling Green Ballpark. The crowd of 6,183 was the largest crowd to ever attend a college baseball game in the Commonwealth of Kentucky.

Basketball

The men's basketball program has the 14th most victories in the history of the NCAA. The school has been to the NCAA Tournament 21 times; in addition, it has made one appearance in the NCAA Final Four, in 1971 (later vacated by the NCAA). WKU also made three appearances in the NIT Final Four while it was a premier post-season tournament, equal in stature to the NCAA Tournament. In Street & Smith's publications "100 Greatest Programs", WKU ranked #31. WKU also has the 3rd most conference titles in NCAA history with 41 trailing only Kentucky and Kansas, 6th in NCAA history with 40 20-win seasons, 8th in NCAA history in winning percentage at 67.2%, and recorded the first 30-win season in NCAA history in the 1937–1938 season with a record of 30–3.

The men's basketball team defeated Middle Tennessee in the 2008 Sun Belt Conference tournament championship game to get a bid into the 2008 NCAA Tournament. The Hilltoppers won their first-round contest against Drake on a last-second three-pointer by Ty Rogers, and won their second-round game against San Diego, before losing by 2 points against UCLA in the Sweet 16. It was the Toppers' third appearance in the Sweet 16 but their first since 1993.  In 2009, the men's basketball team defeated Illinois in the first round of the NCAA Tournament to advance to the second-round game against Gonzaga.  Unfortunately, the Toppers were beaten by a last second shot, failing to advance to their second straight Sweet 16. In the first round of the NCAA Tournament in 2012, the Toppers pulled off a stunning win against Mississippi Valley State, erasing a 16-point deficit with less than five minutes left and pulling off the 59–58 win while President Barack Obama and British Prime Minister David Cameron looked on.

The women's basketball team is a storied program, with three National Collegiate Athletic Association Final Four appearances. In 1992, coach Paul Sanderford's Lady Toppers advanced to the national championship game before bowing out to Stanford. The Lady Toppers are known for their post-season prowess, and returned to the NCAA Tournament in 2014.

Michelle Clark-Heard is the current women's basketball coach at Western Kentucky.  Coach Clark-Heard is a former WKU player who has spent the last five years as an assistant at the University of Louisville under former WKU assistant coach Jeff Walz. Previously, she coached Division II Kentucky State University for two years.  In her five seasons in Louisville, the Cardinals made three regional semifinal appearances and finished as national runner-up in 2009. She helped develop former Louisville forward and current WNBA star Angel McCoughtry, and also helped recruit and develop another current WNBA player, former Cardinals guard Shoni Schimmel.

Clark-Heard also worked as an assistant at Cincinnati and Nebraska before her time at Kentucky State. She played four seasons for the Lady Toppers after being named the 1986 girls' high school player of the year in Kentucky.

Clark-Heard replaced Mary Taylor Cowles, who was fired on March 8 after 10 seasons.

Football

The Hilltopper football team belonged to what was then the Gateway Football Conference until 2006. In 2002, WKU won the NCAA Division I FCS National Football championship. In 2006, the school's board of regents voted to move the team to the Division I Bowl Subdivision (formerly I-A). After two years of provisional status, they began to compete in 2009 as a member of the Sun Belt Conference. An extensive rivalry with Eastern Kentucky University, known as the Battle of the Bluegrass, ended in 2008 as WKU moved into FBS football. The Hilltoppers' biggest Sun Belt rivals had been the Middle Tennessee Blue Raiders, who are less than two hours away from WKU. The rivalry was temporarily halted in 2013 after Middle Tennessee left the Sun Belt for C-USA, but was renewed the following year when WKU moved to C-USA. The Hilltoppers are coached by head coach Tyson Helton

Greek organizations

In 1965 the Western Kentucky University Board of Regents allowed national fraternities and sororities to form local chapters. Currently there are 33 active organizations with approximately 1,500 active undergraduate members per year.

Active fraternities include: 
- Alpha Gamma Rho
- Alpha Phi Alpha
- Alpha Tau Omega
- Delta Tau Delta - FarmHouse
- Iota Phi Theta
- Kappa Sigma
- Kappa Alpha Order
- Kappa Alpha Psi
- Lambda Chi Alpha
- Omega Psi Phi
- Phi Beta Sigma
- Phi Delta Theta
- Phi Gamma Delta
- Pi Kappa Alpha
- Sigma Alpha Epsilon
- Sigma Chi
- Sigma Nu
- Sigma Phi Epsilon

Active sororities include: 
- Alpha Delta Pi
- Alpha Gamma Delta
- Alpha Kappa Alpha
- Alpha Omicron Pi
- Alpha Xi Delta
- Chi Omega
- Delta Sigma Theta
- Delta Zeta 
- Kappa Delta
- Omega Phi Alpha
- Phi Mu
- Sigma Alpha 
- Sigma Gamma Rho
- Sigma Kappa
- Zeta Phi Beta

Predating the national fraternities, there were local fraternities reaching back to the 1930s. The two leading men's social organizations were Phi Phi Kappa (also known as the Thirteeners), founded in 1939; and the Barons, founded the same year. When national Greek organizations were admitted to WKU, Phi Phi Kappa became Delta Tau Delta and the Barons became Alpha Tau Omega.

Media and publications

College Heights Herald, WKU's student-run newspaper since 1924
Talisman, WKU's yearbook
Rise Over Run Magazine, WKU's online magazine for independent culture
WKU SPIRIT, WKU's alumni magazine, published three times each year
WWHR, Revolution 91.7 – WKU's college radio station
WKU NewsChannel 12 – Student-run television newscast. On campus cable channel 12 on Tuesdays and Wednesdays. Re-broadcast on PBS affiliate WKYU at the end of their broadcasting day.
The Extra Point – Student-run television sportscast. This 30-minute show airs on campus cable channel 12 on Thursdays when school is in session. Airs live at 6 and re-airs at the end of the WKYU broadcast day.

WKU Student Publications (Herald and Talisman) moved into a state-of-the-art new facility, the Adams-Whitaker Student Publications Center, in December 2007. The $1.6 million complex was built through a partnership between alumni, who raised more than $1 million, and the university. The  building, across Normal Drive from the School of Journalism and Broadcasting, is named for Robert Adams and the late David B. Whitaker.

Agreement with the University of Akureyri

In 2015, Western Kentucky University (WKU), the University of Akureyri (UNAK) and the Icelandic Arctic Cooperation Network (IACN) signed an academic and research agreement that solidifies the North Atlantic Climate Change Collaboration (NAC3) project.

The NAC3 project focuses on academic exchange, course development, and collaborative research in the areas of climate change, climate literacy, health and wellness, ocean dynamics, sustainability, informal public education, economic development, technology exchange, and water resources, among others.

Notable people

Notes

References

Bibliography

External links

 
 Official athletics website

 
Educational institutions established in 1906
1906 establishments in Kentucky
Universities and colleges accredited by the Southern Association of Colleges and Schools
Education in Warren County, Kentucky
Buildings and structures in Bowling Green, Kentucky
Tourist attractions in Bowling Green, Kentucky
Public universities and colleges in Kentucky